Saurida microlepis is a species of lizardfish that lives coastal waters throughout the Pacific Ocean.

Size
The average length of the Saurida microlepis as an unsexed male is about 45 centimeters.

Habitat
S. microlepis can be found in shallow waters and muddy bottoms.

Location
S. microlepis can be found in shallow coastal waters along the Pacific coast of Asia, and off the coast of the Pacific Northwest of North America.

References

Notes
 

Synodontidae
Fish described in 1931